Eremogeton is a monotypic genus of flowering plants belonging to the family Scrophulariaceae. The only species is Eremogeton grandiflorus.

Its native range is Southeastern Mexico to Guatemala .

References

Scrophulariaceae
Scrophulariaceae genera
Monotypic Lamiales genera